"All I Want to Do" is a song by American rock band the Beach Boys from their 1969 album 20/20. It was written by Dennis Wilson and Stephen Kalinich, and released as the B-side to "I Can Hear Music".

Recording
An earlier version of "All I Want to Do" was produced on October 16, 1968 at Bell Sound in New York. The backing track was redone at Valentine Studio on November 9. At another session, held three days later, Dennis recorded himself at Capitol Studios having sex with a woman, whose throes of passion were incorporated into the track as background sound effects.

Alternate releases
Multiple alternate versions, including two alternate takes with Dennis on lead vocals, were released in 2018 on I Can Hear Music: The 20/20 Sessions.

Personnel
Credits from Craig Slowinski.

The Beach Boys
Al Jardine - backing vocals
Mike Love – lead vocals
Carl Wilson - backing vocals, electric rhythm guitar
Dennis Wilson - backing vocals, piano, Hammond organ, producer
Bruce Johnston - backing vocals

Session musicians
Ed Carter - electric lead guitar, bass
Mike Kowalski – drums
Roger Neumann and six unidentified others - horns

References

External links
 
 
 

1969 songs
The Beach Boys songs
Song recordings produced by Dennis Wilson
Songs written by Dennis Wilson
Songs written by Stephen Kalinich